These are the singles that reached number one on the Top 100 Singles chart in 1985 as published by Cashbox magazine.

See also
1985 in music
List of Hot 100 number-one singles of 1985 (U.S.)

References 
http://members.aol.com/_ht_a/randypny4/cashbox/1985.html
http://www.cashboxmagazine.com/archives/80s_files/1985.html

1985
1985 record charts
1985 in American music